Alan Oxley is an Australian diplomat.

Biography
Oxley worked for the Australian Department of Foreign Affairs and Trade and sometimes in the United Nations in both New York City and Geneva. He became an ambassador to the General Agreement on Tariffs and Trade in 1985  and served there till 1989 until he got a job as a chairman of its contracting parties and of Asia-Pacific Economic Cooperation. He is also a founder of a non-profit organization called World Growth and appeared in various newspapers and news networks. On October 27, 2010, he was accused by many scientists of misrepresentation.

References

Living people
20th-century births
Permanent Representatives of Australia to the World Trade Organization
Year of birth missing (living people)